Arthur Qvist (17 February 1896 – 20 September 1973) was a Norwegian military officer, Nazi collaborator and Olympic horse rider. He commanded the Waffen-SS's Norwegian Legion during World War II. 

Qvist competed in the 1928 Summer Olympics where he earned a silver medal and in the 1936 Summer Olympics. During World War II he served as a Major in the Waffen-SS and was sentenced to 8 years in prison for his collaborationist crimes after the war.

Athletic career

In 1928 he and his horse Hidalgo won the silver medal as member of the Norwegian eventing team in the team eventing competition after finishing eighth in the individual eventing.

Eight years later he finished 17th with his horse Jaspis in the individual dressage competition. As member of the Norwegian dressage team they finished seventh in the team dressage competition. Qvist also participated in the individual jumping competition with his horse Notatus and finished 24th. The Norwegian jumping team did not finish the team jumping competition, because only Qvist was able to finish the event.

Second World War

After the German occupation of Norway in World War II, Qvist joined a voluntary unit of the German Waffen-SS, the Norwegian Legion. As an officer he eventually came to command the unit at the rank of Major. 

At his trial after the war he acknowledged his role as commander of the Norwegian Legion and was sentenced to 8 years in prison.

References

profile

1896 births
1973 deaths
Norwegian male equestrians
Event riders
Norwegian dressage riders
Show jumping riders
Olympic equestrians of Norway
Equestrians at the 1928 Summer Olympics
Equestrians at the 1936 Summer Olympics
Olympic silver medalists for Norway
Olympic medalists in equestrian
Members of Nasjonal Samling
Norwegian Army personnel of World War II
Norwegian prisoners of war in World War II
World War II prisoners of war held by Germany
SS-Obersturmbannführer
SS and Police Leaders
People convicted of treason for Nazi Germany against Norway
Norwegian prisoners and detainees
Norwegian Waffen-SS personnel
Medalists at the 1928 Summer Olympics